Futsal (Spanish:Fútbol Sala), for the 2013 Bolivarian Games, took place from 21 November to 26 November 2013.

Results

References

Events at the 2013 Bolivarian Games
2013 in futsal
2013 Bolivarian Games